Powelliphanta augusta or the Mount Augustus snail, previously provisionally known as Powelliphanta "Augustus", is a species of large, carnivorous land snail, a terrestrial pulmonate gastropod mollusc in the family Rhytididae. Naturally occurring only on Mount Augustus near Westport on New Zealand's South Island, their entire habitat was destroyed by coal mining. The world population was taken into captivity, in theory until their habitat was restored and they could be released. The mining company concerned went bankrupt and habitat restoration has been unsuccessful, so the species' future is uncertain.

Distribution
The species is endemic to the South Island of New Zealand. It was found only on the Mount Augustus ridgeline northeast of Westport, which has since been removed by mining operations of the state-owned company Solid Energy.

The species was first discovered in 1996 by members of the Nelson Botanical Society, however, the Department of Conservation was unaware of its existence until 2004. Department of Conservation scientists initially thought that there appeared to be fewer than 1,000 of these snails.

Description
The eggs are between 5 and 6 mm in diameter, with a calcium shell.

Conservation status
The species is listed as Nationally Critical on the New Zealand Threat Classification System.

Mining of habitat
From 2004, plans by Solid Energy to destroy the main habitat of the Powelliphanta "Augustus" while mining for coal caused controversy (see Save Happy Valley Campaign). Solid Energy, whose past mining activities had already significantly reduced the species' habitat, planned to mine the skyline ridge that included Mount Augustus.

In May 2005 Solid Energy sought a permit from the New Zealand Department of Conservation to translocate some Powelliphanta "Augustus", but they intended to begin mining regardless of whether the permit was granted or not.

The Royal Forest and Bird Protection Society obtained a declaration in December 2005 from the High Court requiring Solid Energy to get permission from the Minister of Conservation and the Minister of Energy for the translocation, as well as any transfer of heavy machinery, and any impact on habitat. Permission was granted in April 2006 for this translocation plan.

This was condemned by Forest and Bird, by the Save Happy Valley Coalition and by the Green Party, in part because of significant doubts as to whether the translocation would succeed, and the lack of guarantee that this measure would protect the species from extinction. The numbers of this Powelliphanta species are estimated to be fewer than 500, and their existing habitat covers 3 to 4 ha.  The Wildlife Permit granted allowed Solid Energy to mine 96% of this area. There was also concern over the destruction of Powelliphanta habitat by the mining company OMYA on Mount Burnett, in Golden Bay.

Translocations

In early December 2006, twenty snails removed from Solid Energy's opencast mine expansion at Stockton were released back into the wild. By late December 2006, one of the 20 translocated snails had been found dead.
 
A further 20 snails collected from the ridgeline of the mine site were also released about 800 metres from where they were found into an area of the Stockton Plateau that will not be mined.

On 8 January 2007 the Department of Conservation announced plans to release another 200 snails back into the wild at Stockton open-cast mine.

In April 2010, a Department of Conservation officer reported that 1552 snails were still held in refrigerators in Hokitika.

In August 2010, Rod Morris reported in Forest and Bird on the status of P. augustus. Morris had visited the re-location site, just northwest of the original Mt. Augustus site, where the original soil and vegetation from Mt. Augustus had been transferred to. He observed that larger trees had died, and introduced weed species such as gorse and rushes had invaded. Morris stated "The once complex mosaic of dense, low sub-alpine scrub and deep undisturbed litter has gone". However, 1600 snails had been translocated from Hokitika to the re-created site. Another 2300 snails had been moved to two sites at Mt Rochfort. At each site, 50 snails were tagged with transponders and these snails had a 30% rate of mortality after 18 months. Morris noted that Landcare Research considered that the snail populations would not survive that rate of mortality.

In November 2011, 800 snails died in a Department of Conservation fridge.

References

External links 

 Boyer S., Wratten S. D., Holyoake A., Abdelkrim J. & Cruickshank R. H. (2013). "Using Next-Generation Sequencing to Analyse the Diet of a Highly Endangered Land Snail (Powelliphanta augusta) Feeding on Endemic Earthworms". PLoS ONE 8(9): e75962. .
 
Powelliphanta augusta discussed on RNZ Critter of the Week, 12 October 2018

Powelliphanta
Gastropods described in 2008
Endemic molluscs of New Zealand
Endemic fauna of New Zealand